Aisha Franz (born 1984) is a German illustrator and comic book artist based in Berlin.

Her work lays in the convergence of daily life routine and the existential inquiries around them, highlighting the absurdity of human reality. Aisha Franz has internationally published graphic novels and zines. She also taught at the Kunsthochschule Kassel in the class for illustration and comic together with Hendrik Dorgathen.

Life 
The daughter of Colombian-Chilean immigrants, she was born in Fürth. Franz originally wanted to be a figure skater and create animated drawings for Walt Disney. She went on to study illustration at the School of Art and Design in Kassel.

Work 
She lives and works in Berlin. Franz is part of the German comic publishing collective The Treasure Fleet.

Her graphic novel Alien received an award for best foreign work at the 2013 .

Selected works 
 Alien (2011)
 Brigitte under der Perlenhort (2013), published in French as Brigitte et la perle cachée
 Shit is Real (2016)

References

External links 
 

1984 births
Living people
German comics artists
German female comics artists
German women illustrators
People from Fürth